Domony is a village in Pest County, Hungary.

Notable residents 
 Zoltán Huszárik, Hungarian film director, screenwriter, visual artist and actor

References

Populated places in Pest County